Montesardo is a frazione in the comune of Alessano in the province of Lecce in the Apulia region, Italy. As of the 2001 census, it has a population of 1,369.

Geography

Territory 
Montesardo is the third highest area in the province of Lecce after  and Monte Sant'Eleuterio. The village developed on the southern continuation of the Serra dei Cianci mountain, so the village is sometimes referred to as "Serra di Montesardo".

Climate 
Montesardo has a Mediterranean climate, with mild winters and hot summers. Rainfall is at a minimum during spring and summer and peaks during autumn and winter.

History 

Records of Montesardo begin in the 16th century. In his work , Italian scholar Galateo describes an "" with a large circular wall and visible ruins of ancient houses located on a hill called "", about seven miles away from Leuca. Galateo also recalls that the town was called "" by the Greeks, interpreted in Latin as "" or "", meaning steep or rugged mountain.

Over time, the area would have taken the name "Monsarduus" from Latin, from which the current name of Montesardo would have derived.

Archaeological research has since identified traces that confirm the existence of this settlement. A hint of the presence of an ancient settlement in the area was given when a tomb was found in 1953 in a rocky bank in Alessano. In 1997, the first systematic excavation was carried out, which revealed the remains of a large building that had been built with blocks of tuff. During construction excavations near the Romasi Castle in the second half of the 1980s, ceramic material was recovered, giving an indication of a population in the area between the 9th and the 1st century BC.

After the fall of the Western Roman Empire, Montesardo was used as a fortress due to its bastions, fortified castle, and circle of walls interspersed with towers. These walls and towers were demolished in 1867. Montesardo was also a seat of important schools of mathematics, philosophy, and music. During World War II, the land was occupied by German troops.

Places of interest

Mother Church 
The Mother Church, dedicated to the Presentation of the Blessed Virgin Mary, was built in 1727 at the wish of Fulvio Gennaro Caracciolo , the 3rd Duke of Montesardo. It stands on the site of a pre-existing building that dates back to the  centuries.

The church is separated into two levels by an architrave. On the lower level, two alcoves at the side of the framed entrance portal house statues in lecce stone, a type of limestone found in the Salento region. On the south-facing exterior, there is a large fresco depicting Saint Christopher. On  the upper level, there is a rectangular stained glass window depicting a cross. Inside, there are some baroque altars with paintings and statues above them. There is also an organ and a pulpit dating back to the 18th century.

Church of Saint Barbara 

The Church of Saint Barbara, which dates back to the 13th century, was annexed to the female monastery of the Benedictines. It has been almost completely destroyed and is used today for agricultural purposes.

The church has a small rose window with a lunette below it. The interior is a single room that preserves traces of ancient frescoes that once covered the entire inside of the structure. The frescoes depict the Byzantine era to the 15th century. A depiction of Saint Barbara can be seen holding a tower in her right hand, an iconographic symbol of the saint. There is also a 14th century deesis, although it is missing the figure of St. John the Baptist.

It is uncertain when the church was abandoned. Bishop Ercole Lamia did not include it in the report of his pastoral visit to Montesardo in 1590. However, it was still frequented by the faithful until the 18th century. The building is now private property and used for agricultural purposes.

Church of the Immaculate Conception 
The Church of the Immaculate Conception dates back to 1870. It was built soon after the proclamation of the dogma of the Immaculate Conception. On the lunette, there is a frescoed scene of the Passion of Christ.

Castle 
The castle is located in the old town center. It is said to have been commissioned by the Caracciolo family or those related to the Orsini family. It was built between the 15th and 16th centuries. Over time, the original layout has been considerably changed as the building has undergone significant transformations.

The layout of the building is square in shape with four towers at the corners, also square-shaped. A fence runs along the perimeter. Inside, there is a square, once used for military purposes, that is overlooked by all rooms of the castle. The square was originally connected to the outside by a drawbridge, which has since been replaced by a hybrid masonry connection. The walls have a slightly protruding parapet decorated with corbels.

In the 20th century the castle was bought by the Romasi barons. After World War II, it was passed from the family to the Vocationist Fathers, who today manage the building as a retirement home for the elderly.

Events 
 Fair of Saint Stephen – a trade fair that occurs on the first Monday after Easter Monday
 Feast of Saint Anthony – occurs on the second Sunday of July, on or around the feast day of Anthony of Padua
  – occurs annually on 12 August. A food festival with homemade pasta and pork prepared according to traditional Salento recipes.

References

Further reading 
 Montefusco, Luigi Antonio (1994). . Istituto araldico salentino Amilcare Foscarini.
 Caloro, Antonio, Melcarne, Antonio, Nicolì, Vincenzo (1994). . Laborgraf.
 Pranzo, Alberto (2008). . Edizioni del Grifo. .

Frazioni of the Province of Lecce
Cities and towns in Apulia
Frazioni of Apulia
Localities of Salento